The Tipperary Intermediate Hurling Championship is an annual hurling competition organised by the Tipperary County Board of the Gaelic Athletic Association since 1979 for the third-tier hurling teams in the county of Tipperary in Ireland.

The series of games are played during the summer and autumn months with the county final currently being played at Semple Stadium in October. The championship has always been played on a regional basis, whereby the respective champions from the Mid, North, South and West championships contest the county series of games. However, in recent years, the championship has followed the same system as the senior grade in Tipperary. Currently (2018) there are 21 teams in the county championship divided up into 6 groups (3 groups with 4 teams, 3 groups with 3 teams). The top 2 teams of each group qualify for the knock out phase of the championship along with the 4 divisional winners. It is quite common for clubs to progress from their group and also win their respective divisional championship.

The Tipperary County Championship is an integral part of the wider Munster GAA Intermediate Club Hurling Championship. The winners of the Tipperary county final join the champions of the other hurling counties to contest the provincial championship.

The title has been won at least once by 32 different clubs.

Lorrha-Dorrha are the current (2022) titleholders, having beating Moneygall in the final, on a score line of 4-15 to 3-12.

Roll of Honour

Finals

References

External links
 Tipperary GAA Archive
 Tipperary club titles on Hogan Stand

2
H
Intermediate hurling county championships